Clinton Public Library is located in Clinton, Iowa, United States.  The main library is located downtown and is listed on the National Register of Historic Places.  The Lyons Branch is located on the north side of the city.

Main Library
The main library building was designed by the Chicago architectural firm of Patton & Miller and funded by Andrew Carnegie.   The Beaux-Arts style building was constructed by Daniel Haring from 1903-1904.  It is a two-story structure built on top of a raised basement. The exterior walls are composed of cut and dressed limestone.  An addition was built in the rear of the original building and houses the main two-level stack area.  A modern canopy was added over the entry at grade level to the basement.  It was listed on the National Register of Historic Places in 1983.

References

External links
Library Web Site

Library buildings completed in 1904
Beaux-Arts architecture in Iowa
Buildings and structures in Clinton, Iowa
National Register of Historic Places in Clinton County, Iowa
Libraries on the National Register of Historic Places in Iowa
Public libraries in Iowa
Carnegie libraries in Iowa
Education in Clinton County, Iowa
1904 establishments in Iowa